"Wetter" is a song by American rapper Twista off his seventh album Category F5 and released as the first single. The song features the singer Erika Shevon, and was produced by The Legendary Traxster. It is sometimes referred to as the second part to the song "Get It Wet" off his 1997 album Adrenaline Rush due its similarities. It was released as a digital download on February 24, 2009. The radio version is remixed. The song contains elements from Janet Jackson's 1994 hit "Any Time, Any Place". It is a straightforward slow jam, with Shevon's vocal chorus punctuating Twista's two verses. The 'calling you daddy' section serves as both an intro and outro. There is a freestyle by Lil Wayne & Shanell called "Wayne On Me" from Wayne's 2009 mixtape No Ceilings. This song is Twista's highest-charting single since Girl Tonite (2005).

Formats and track listing
Promo CD single
"Wetter" (Squeaky Clean Version) (featuring Erika Shevon) - 4:18
"Wetter" (Clean Version) (featuring Erika Shevon) - 4:18
"Wetter" (Explicit Version) (featuring Erika Shevon) - 4:18
"Wetter" (Instrumental) - 4:18
"Wetter" (Acapella) (featuring Erika Shevon) - 4:16

Digital single
"Wetter" (featuring Erika Shevon) - 4:16
"Wetter" (Radio Version) (featuring Erika Shevon) - 4:16
"Wetter" (Instrumental Version) (featuring Erika Shevon) - 4:16

Charts

Weekly charts

Year-end charts

Certifications

References

2009 singles
Twista songs
Music videos directed by Erik White
2009 songs
Capitol Records singles
Songs written by Twista
Songs written by The Legendary Traxster